Stefanie Drootin is one half of the band Umm and one half of the band Big Harp (band) on Saddle Creek Records. She is also the bass guitarist for the band The Good Life on Saddle Creek Records. Stefanie  plays or has played in Bright Eyes, She and Him, M.Ward, McCarthy Trenching, Azure Ray, Orenda Fink  and Maria Taylor.

Album appearances
Bright Eyes - There Is No Beginning to the Story (2002, Saddle Creek)
Bright Eyes - Motion Sickness (2005 · Team Love)
Bright Eyes - Cassadaga (2007, Saddle Creek)
Bright Eyes - A Christmas AlbumGood Life - Album of The YearGood Life - Lovers Need Lawyers"
Good Life - Help Wanted NightsGood Life - "Everybody's Coming Down"
Big Harp - "White Hat"
Big Harp - "Chain Letters"
Big Harp - "Waveless"
Maria Taylor - Lynn Teeter FlowerBooks on Tape - Dinosaur Dinosaur''

References

External links
 
 Saddle Creek Records
 
 

Year of birth missing (living people)
Living people
American bass guitarists
Women bass guitarists